Local elections held in Tagbilaran, Bohol on May 9, 2016 within the Philippine general election. The voters selected leaders for the elective local posts in the city: the mayor, vice mayor, and the ten councilors.

Background
Incumbent John Geesnell Yap II of the Liberal Party is running for a second term.  His running mate is incumbent vice mayor Jose Antonio Veloso.  The alliance between the Yap and Veloso camps, known as the second iteration of "Pundok Panaghiusa", was sealed only about two weeks before the filing of certificates of candidacy in October 2015.

Yap's main opponent is incumbent Poblacion I barangay chairperson Arlene Karaan, who is running under the Partido ng Masang Pilipino.  Karaan, who ran for board member for Bohol's first district in the 2013 elections but lost, is strongly associated with the camp of former city mayor Dan Neri Lim, and she has a slate of five councilors but without a vice mayor.  Speculation has it that she will be substituted by Lim before the December 20, 2015 substitution deadline for all candidates for the forthcoming election.

Election results

Mayor

Vice Mayor

Councilors

The city's voters elected ten candidates to the City Council at large.  The ten candidates with the highest number of votes wins the seats per district.

|style="background-color:black;height:0.3em;" colspan=5|

Pundok Panaghiusa (Team BaTo)

Pwersa ng Masang Pilipino

Results

The candidates for mayor, vice mayor, and district representative with the highest number of votes won the seat; they are voted separately, therefore, they may be of different parties when elected.

Notes

References

2016 Philippine local elections
Elections in Bohol